Constanza Verónica Hube Portus (born 10 March 1987) is a Chilean lawyer who was elected as a member of the Chilean Constitutional Convention. She holds a law degree from the Pontifical Catholic University of Chile and an LLM from New York University.  

She is also a Constitutional Law Professor at her alma mater. By the other hand, she is linked to the think tank Libertad y Desarrollo.

References

External links
 

Living people
1987 births
21st-century Chilean lawyers
21st-century Chilean politicians
Pontifical Catholic University of Chile alumni
Independent Democratic Union politicians
Members of the Chilean Constitutional Convention
People from Santiago
21st-century Chilean women politicians
Fulbright alumni